GUH may refer to:
 Guahibo language
 Gunnedah Airport, in New South Wales, Australia
 MedStar Georgetown University Hospital, in Washington, D.C., US